Mirabeau was one of the six  semi-dreadnought battleships built for the  (French Navy) in the first decade of the twentieth century. Completed in 1911, the ship often served as a flagship before the beginning of World War I three years later. Mirabeau spent the war in the Mediterranean Sea and spent most of her time blockading the Straits of Otranto and the Dardanelles to prevent German, Austro-Hungarian and Ottoman warships from breaking out into the Mediterranean. She also participated in the attempt to ensure Greek acquiescence to Allied operations in Macedonia in late 1916. Mirabeau briefly participated in the occupation of Constantinople after the end of the war in late 1918 and was deployed in the Black Sea in early 1919 during the Allied intervention in the Russian Civil War. She ran aground in February 1919 off the coast of the Crimea and could not be refloated until some of her guns,  armor and boilers were removed. After returning to France later that year, the ship was stricken from the Navy List. Mirabeau was given to a salvage company as payment for salvaging another battleship and broken up in 1922.

Design and description

Although the s were a significant improvement from the preceding , they were outclassed by the advent of the dreadnought well before they were completed. She displaced  at normal load and had a crew of 25 officers and 831 enlisted men. While serving as a flagship, her crew numbered 31 officers and 886 enlisted men. The ship was powered by four Parsons steam turbines, each driving one propeller shaft using steam generated by twenty-six Belleville boilers.

The main battery of the Dantons consisted of four Canon de  modèle 1906 mounted in two twin gun turrets, one forward and one aft of the superstructure. Their secondary armament consisted of a dozen Canon de  modèle 1902 guns in twin turrets, three on each side of the ship. A number of smaller guns were carried for defense against torpedo boats. These included sixteen Canon de  modèle 1908 guns in casemates in the sides of the hull and eight  Hotchkiss guns mounted on the superstructure. She was also armed with two submerged  torpedo tubes, one on each broadside. The sides of the conning tower consisted of  armor plates.

Wartime modifications
The four aft 75-millimeter gun positions were very prone to flooding in anything other than calm weather and were removed from the Dantons in 1915–1917; their embrasures were plated over to stop the flooding. The four 47-millimeter guns on the aft superstructure were transferred to other ships at some point during the war. Those on the forward superstructure received high-angle mounts and were repositioned to better serve as anti-aircraft guns.

Construction and career

Ordered as part of the second tranche of the 1900 naval law that authorized a total of 19 battleships by 1919, Mirabeau was named after Honoré Riqueti, comte de Mirabeau, an early leader of the French Revolution. Construction of the ship began on 8 May 1906 at the Arsenal de Lorient and she was laid down on 4 May 1908. Mirabeau was launched on 28 October 1909 and was completed on 1 August 1911. Upon reaching Toulon on 15 August, the ship became the flagship of Rear Admiral Dominique-Marie Gauchet, commander of the Mediterranean Squadron ('s) Second Division of the First Battle Squadron. Together with four of her sisters, she participated in a large naval review by the President of France, Armand Fallières, off Cap Brun on 4 September and then the visit by the Navy Minister, Théophile Delcassé on the 8th.

In mid-April 1912, the First Battle Squadron hosted three British armored cruisers at Golfe-Juan as their commander, Rear-Admiral Edward Gamble unveiled monuments to King Edward VII and his mother, Queen Victoria, at Cannes. Mirabeau participated in the July maneuvers in the Western Mediterranean and the exercise simulating a blockade of Ajaccio, Corsica, in November. On 3 March 1913 the First Battle Squadron conducted gunnery training off the Îles d'Hyères with the First Lord of the Admiralty, Winston Churchill, observing. The ship participated in combined fleet maneuvers between Provence and French Tunisia in May–June and the subsequent naval review conducted by the President of the Council, Raymond Poincaré, on 7 June. Rear Admiral Marie-Jean-Lucien Lacaze relieved Gauchet on 16 August and Mirabeau joined her squadron in its tour of the Eastern Mediterranean in October–December, making port visits in Egypt, Syria, and Greece.

Lacaze shifted his flag to her sister  on 12 March 1914 and the ship had to briefly withdraw from the grand fleet exercises on 13 May due to engine troubles. As tensions rose during the July Crisis, Mirabeau and the other ships of the First Battle Squadron downloaded their practice ammunition and exchanged suspect lots of propellant for new ones beginning on 27 July. They recoaled four days later and the  mobilized on 2 August.

World War I
Before the French declared war on the German Empire on the morning of 4 August, Vice Admiral Augustin Boué de Lapeyrère, commander of the 1st Naval Army, as the Mediterranean Squadron had been renamed in 1913, ordered most of his ships to concentrate off the Algerian coast to escort troop convoys to Metropolitan France and to blockade German shipping in the Mediterranean. Despite this deployment the German battlecruiser  and light cruiser  were able to bombard Bône and Philippeville on 4 August. Mirabeau spent the rest of the month under repair. Aside from several uneventful sorties into the Adriatic, the French capital ships spent most of their time cruising between the neutral Greek and Italian coasts to prevent the Austro-Hungarian fleet from attempting to break out of the Adriatic. The torpedoing of the dreadnought battleship  on 21 December by the Austro-Hungarian submarine  showed that the battleships were vulnerable to this threat, and they were withdrawn to spend the rest of the month further south at an anchorage in Navarino Bay.

On 11 January 1915, the French were alerted that the Austro-Hungarian fleet was going to sortie from its base at Pola, so the Naval Army sailed north to the Albanian coast. It proved to be a false alarm, and they were back at their moorings three days later. In the meantime, the ships patrolled the Ionian Sea. The declaration of war on Austria-Hungary by Italy on 23 May, and the Italian decision to assume responsibility for naval operations in the Adriatic, allowed the French Navy to withdraw to either Malta or Bizerte, Tunisia, to cover the Otranto Barrage. Mirabeau was in Malta on 30 June when a torpedo exploded in a nearby warehouse. The ship was only lightly damaged, but two men of her crew were killed and eleven wounded.

In November 1916, she transported landing parties from the other ships of her division to Athens. On 1 December, those landing parties participated in the Allied attempt to ensure Greek acquiescence to Allied operations in Macedonia. Greek resistance to the Allied action ended after Mirabeau fired four rounds from her main armament into the city, one of which landed near the Royal Palace. Afterwards, she spent 1917 based at Corfu or at Mudros to prevent Goeben, by this time transferred to the Ottoman Empire and renamed Yavuz Sultan Selim, from breaking out into the Mediterranean. In August the ship tested a tethered balloon, but it was destroyed by a lightning strike on 31 October. The 1st Naval Army was reorganized on 1 July and most of the Danton-class ships were assigned to the Second Squadron with Mirabeau part of the First Division of the squadron.

Postwar

After the Armistice of Mudros was signed on 30 October between the Allies and the Ottoman Empire, the ship participated in the early stage of the occupation of Constantinople beginning on 12 November. By 8 December Mirabeau was already deployed to the Black Sea to support White Russian forces in Sevastopol and deter Soviet forces who were advancing on the city during the Russian Civil War. Mirabeau ran aground during a snowstorm on 18 February 1919 off the Crimean coast. She could not be refloated until  of weight were removed. To this end, her guns, turret armour, most of her boilers, coal, ammunition and the upper strake of belt armor was disembarked. This process began on 12 April, but Mirabeau was refloated three days later as news was received of the Red Army's advance on the city. Only her guns, ammunition and part of her armor had been replaced by the time the city was evacuated by the Allies on 5 May. She was towed to Constantinople by the battleship  and five tugs where she remained from 7–15 May. Justice then resumed the tow and they reached Toulon on the 24th. After an inspection of the ship in a drydock, Mirabeau was stricken on 22 August and turned over as compensation to the company that salvaged the pre-dreadnought battleship . Her hulk was towed to Savona, Italy, to be scrapped on 28 April 1922.

Notes

Bibliography

Further reading

External links 

  CUIRASSE Danton

Danton-class battleships
Ships built in France
1909 ships
Maritime incidents in 1919
Shipwrecks in the Black Sea